Synanthedon conopiformis,  Dale's oak clearwing, is a moth of the family Sesiidae. It is found in almost all of Europe, except the north.

The wingspan is 16–19 mm. Adults are on wing from June to August.

The larvae feed on Quercus robur, Quercus petraea and Quercus rubra. They bore into the stem of their host plant.

References

Moths described in 1782
Sesiidae
Moths of Europe